Zuzana Čaputová (Strapáková; born 21 June 1973) is a Slovak politician, lawyer and environmental activist. She is the fifth president of Slovakia, a position she has held since 15 June 2019. Čaputová is the first woman to hold the presidency, as well as the youngest president in the history of Slovakia, elected at the age of 45.

Čaputová first became known by prevailing in a decade-long struggle against the situating of a toxic landfill in her hometown of Pezinok. For this, Čaputová was awarded the 2016 Goldman Environmental Prize. She won the 2019 Slovak presidential election with 58% of the vote in the run-off.

Early life and education 
Zuzana Strapáková was born into a working-class family in Bratislava. She grew up in the nearby town of Pezinok, in what was Czechoslovakia for the first two decades of her life. She has described her upbringing as having occurred within "an open-minded house".

She studied at the Comenius University Faculty of Law in Bratislava, graduating in 1996. Between 1998 and 1999 she completed the training cycle "General Management – Management of Change" and in 1999 the ARK – Mediation course, accredited by the Ministry of Education of Slovakia.

Early career 
After concluding her education, Čaputová worked in the local government of Pezinok, first as an assistant in the legal department, and later as a deputy to the town mayor.

She later moved into the non-profit sector at the Open Society Foundations, where she handled public administration and the issue of abused and exploited children. Subsequently, she worked as a project manager at the civic association EQ Klub on local community development.

Between 2001 and 2017, Čaputová worked with Via Iuris, a civic organization, as a lawyer (since 2010), and with Greenpeace on campaign planning. In Pezinok, for more than ten years, she was at the forefront of a public campaign against the authorization of another landfill that would aggravate pollution of the soil, air, and water in the city and its surrounding areas. The fight against the landfill culminated in 2013, when the Supreme Court of Slovakia ruled that the new landfill was illegal and violated environmental norms.

Čaputová has run her own law firm and authored and co-authored several publications. She is a fellow of the Environmental Law Alliance Worldwide (ELAW), a network of environmental lawyers and jurists.

Political activities

In December 2017, Čaputová announced her entry into the emerging political party Progressive Slovakia, and in January 2018, she was elected as a Vice-Chairwoman at the party's first congress, aiding 's efforts to assure the representation of a credible socially-liberal alternative to the conservative status quo in Slovakia.

As a co-founding member of Progressive Slovakia, a non-parliamentary socially liberal and progressive party, she served as its Deputy Chair until March 2019, when she resigned due to her presidential candidacy. Čaputová was the party's candidate in the 2019 Slovak presidential election and proceeded to be elected president in the second round, after receiving over 58% of the vote and beating her opponent Vice President of the European Commission Maroš Šefčovič, an independent who was supported by the long-dominant Smer–SD party.

Presidency 

In a press conference held on 29 March 2018, Čaputová announced her bid for the Slovak presidency in the 2019 presidential race as the candidate of Progressive Slovakia. Robert Mistrík, another strong contender, withdrew from the race and endorsed her on 26 February 2019. She said she had felt compelled to run for the Presidency after the murder of the investigative journalist Ján Kuciak.

Čaputová won the first round of the election on 16 March 2019, with 40.57% of the vote. She then defeated her second-place opponent, Maroš Šefčovič, by around 58% to 42% in the second run-off round on 30 March 2019. The second-round turnout of just 41.79% was the lowest for any round of voting in that type of election in Slovakia. The number of votes with which Čaputová was elected to office was also the lowest for any directly elected Slovak president to date. Her presidential inauguration took place on 15 June 2019 during a special session of the National Council in Bratislava.

She was rated as the most trusted politician in the country in both 2020 and 2021, with 83% and 58% of citizens polled saying they saw her as trustworthy, respectively. A December 2019 poll in the neighboring Czech Republic showed that she had a higher approval rating there (54% approval, 18% disapproval) than incumbent President Miloš Zeman (46% approval, 50% disapproval).

A poll in late May 2022 reported that 15% of voters would "certainly" vote for her, with additional 34% considering a vote for her in the next presidential election, which is scheduled for April 2024.

Political positions

Equality 
On her campaign website, Čaputová says that "justice in Slovakia does not always apply equally to everyone". In keeping with her statements during the campaign, she plans to introduce changes to Slovakia's police and judicial system. She campaigned for the police force to be an independent institution without political influence, headed by an impartial professional with proven service. She further claims that it is necessary to transform the prosecutor's office into a publicly managed institution.

Environment 
Čaputová is an environmental campaigner who has been compared to American activist Erin Brockovich. Climate change mitigation is one of her highest priorities, and for that reason she is ending subsidies for coal and other fossil fuels. Čaputová has promised to phase out coal mining and power generation by 2023, and brought her nation into the Powering Past Coal Alliance.

Čaputová holds that environmental protection should include stopping illegal deforestation and that 5% of the most environmentally valuable territory should remain as a strictly protected zone.

LGBT rights

Čaputová has stated that she supports registered partnerships for same-sex couples, and educating the general public on these relationships. In a discussion organized by SME, she lectured on the possibility of adoption by gay couples: "I prefer the child to have a biological mother and a biological father. If he were to grow up in institutional care, I think he'd be better off with two loving beings, even if they were of the same sex."

Abortion and reproductive rights 
Čaputová supports maintaining the status quo regarding abortion and reproductive rights, saying: "If there is an extreme situation and the dilemma is between deciding whether to adopt a legal norm that will intrude upon the personal lives of citizens or leave it to women's responsibility and their personal choice, I choose the responsibility of a woman."

Personal life 
Čaputová is divorced and has two daughters. She practices Zen yoga. She still lives in Pezinok.

Awards and recognition

For her strong and resolute leadership regarding the Pezinok landfill affair, Čaputová was awarded the Goldman Environmental Prize in 2016. Laureates of this prize are selected by an international jury and experts from around the world who have distinguished themselves for having a lasting and significant impact on environmental protection. The Goldman award was delivered to Čaputová in San Francisco. Her long and eventually triumphant struggle has been compared to that of the American Erin Brockovich. The text of the prize states that she was awarded for her "relentless campaigning against the opening of a landfill in the town of Pezinok, which, if opened, would further aggravate potential health hazards and would contribute to urban pollution". In recognition of her efforts for the European democracy, Čaputová was awarded the European Prize for Political Culture in August 2019.

In 2020, she was ranked No. 83 in Forbes list of the World's 100 Most Powerful Women. In 2021, she was ranked at No. 86.

Honours

National honours
 : Order of the White Double Cross
 : Order of Ľudovít Štúr
 : Pribina Cross
 : Cross of Milan Rastislav Štefánik
 : Order of Andrej Hlinka

Foreign honours
 : Grand Cross of the Order of the Redeemer (6 September 2022)
 : Grand Cross of the Order of the Netherlands Lion (7 March 2023)

Nongovernmental organizations 

 : Tree of Peace Memorial Plaque (Brookwood Military Cemetery, 4 December 2019).

See also 

 List of elected and appointed female heads of state and government
 List of international trips made by Zuzana Čaputová

References

External links

1973 births
21st-century Slovak politicians
21st-century Slovak women politicians
21st-century Slovak lawyers
Presidents of Slovakia
Comenius University alumni
Slovak LGBT rights activists
Living people
Politicians from Bratislava
People from Pezinok
Progressive Slovakia politicians
Slovak environmentalists
Slovak women environmentalists
Slovak humanists
Slovak women lawyers
Women presidents
21st-century women lawyers
Goldman Environmental Prize awardees
Women civil rights activists
Female heads of state